Orchard Farm High School is a public high school in St. Charles, Missouri that is part of the Orchard Farm School District.
The school serves the towns of West Alton and Portage Des Sioux as well as parts of the city of St. Charles and St. Charles County.

Location

Orchard Farm High School is located approximately 7 miles north of Highway 370 along Highway 94. OFHS serves students from St. Charles, Orchard Farm, Portage Des Sioux, West Alton, Machens and Black Walnut. The district covers approximately 125 square miles.

History
The school district was created on February 14, 1959, having combined 15 smaller schools into what was previously the St. Charles R-V School District.

The Orchard Farm Elementary School, the Orchard Farm Middle School, and the Orchard Farm High School are on the original campus, while Discovery Elementary School, at 500 Discovery Path Lane, opened in late 2010. The Early Learning Center, at 3489 Boschertown Road, opened in August 2016.
 
In 2017, the Orchard Farm School District earned 100% on the state's APR. For two consecutive years, the Orchard Farm School District was named in the Top Five for Mid-Sized Companies by the St. Louis Post Dispatch.

References

High schools in St. Charles County, Missouri
Educational institutions established in 1959
Public high schools in Missouri
Buildings and structures in St. Charles County, Missouri
1959 establishments in Missouri